The Assam State Zoo cum Botanical Garden (popularly known as Guwahati Zoo) is the largest of its kind in the North East region and it is spread across 432 acre (175 hectare). The zoo is located within the Hengrabari Reserved Forest at Guwahati, India. The zoo is home to about 895 animals, birds and reptiles representing almost 113 species of animals and birds from around the world.

The Divisional officer of Assam State Zoo is Mr Tejas Mariswamy from Mysore, Karnataka.

History
The 64th session of Indian National Congress was held in Guwahati, in 1957. The Organising committee of INC organised an exhibit with included few animals and birds, of which a female leopard cub named Spotty was the favourite. After the meeting came to an end, it was felt to necessity of a zoo to house these animals.

These animals were shifted to Japorigog in the Hengrabari Reserve forest, with an area of 130 Hectare, suitable to create facilities and house these animals, thus, The Assam State Zoo was established in the year 1957 and was open to public viewing in the year 1958.

The total number of animals and birds, at the time of its inception was 42 (22 species) and 236 (31 species) respectively.

Over the years, the zoo grew and expanded to accommodate eye-catching exotic ones like chimpanzees, white rhinos & black rhinos, zebras, ostriches and giraffes from Africa; puma, jaguar and llama from South America and kangaroos from Australia. To get these exotic animals the zoo used to send indigenous animals like one horned Indian rhinoceros and others, to many countries. Through later the importance was shifted to indigenous species and several captive breeding programs also started which were successful. In the year 1959 a forest division was created as Assam State Zoo Division and the zoo was put under this division.

The Assam State Zoo also added a museum and in the year 1982 a botanical garden and so Assam State Zoo became The Assam State Zoo cum Botanical Garden.

In 2002 another 45 hectare area of the Hengrabari Reserve Forests were added to the zoo and thus, the total area of the zoo became 175 hectare and in August, 2005 the Animal Adoption Scheme launched.

Mission

Apart from being the region’s premier zoo and ex-situ conservation centre, we aim to offer quality services and facilities in rescue and rehabilitation of wild animals, nature awareness, interpretation and responsible nature-tourism. We shall continue to act as a repository of wild bio-diversity and a green lung for the city of Guwahati. We shall also strive to make Assam State Zoo Cum Botanical Garden the best and complete recreational and educational destination in the whole of North-east India.

See also

 List of Botanical Gardens in India and the "Indian portion" of the international List of botanical gardens
 "Assam State Zoo cum Botanical Garden", by: GK Dutta

Notes

External links

 Official website of: "Central Zoo Authority of India" (CZA), Government of India

Zoos in India
Tourist attractions in Guwahati
1958 establishments in Assam
Zoos established in 1958